KHLW (89.3 FM) is a radio station licensed to Tabor, Iowa, United States.  The station airs a format consisting of Christian talk and teaching and Christian music, and is currently owned by Calvary Chapel of Omaha. The station serves southwestern Iowa, northwestern Missouri, and eastern Nebraska.

References

External links
KHLW's website

HLW
Radio stations established in 2012
2012 establishments in Iowa